USS R-1 (SS-78) was the lead ship of the R-class coastal and harbor defense submarines of the United States Navy.

Construction and commissioning
R-1′s keel was laid down on 16 October 1917 by the Fore River Shipbuilding Company in Quincy, Massachusetts. She was launched on 24 August 1918, sponsored by Mrs. George W. Dashiell, and commissioned on 16 December 1918 at Boston, Massachusetts.

Service history

1918–1931
After shakedown in New England waters, R-1 was assigned to Submarine Division 9 of the Atlantic Fleet and based at New London, Connecticut.

Given hull classification symbol SS-78 in July 1920, R-1 was ordered to the Pacific Ocean on 11 April 1921, transited the Panama Canal in late May, and arrived on 30 June at her new base, San Pedro, California. She took part in fleet exercises off Central America from 5 February through 6 April 1923, returned to San Pedro on 10 April, and on 16 July was transferred, along with Division 9, to Pearl Harbor where for the next eight years she trained crews and developed submarine tactics.

Departing San Diego on 5 January 1931 R-1 sailed for Philadelphia, Pennsylvania, via the Panama Canal, arrived on 9 February and was decommissioned there on 1 May.

1940–1946
She was recommissioned in ordinary on 23 September 1940 at Groton, Connecticut, overhauled and commissioned in full on 16 October. R-1 got underway with Submarine Squadron 3, Division 42 on 10 December for the Panama Canal Zone. Stationed at Coco Solo for a year, she was reassigned to Division 31 in June 1941, ordered to New London in October for a refit, and transferred to Squadron 7.

At New London on 7 December 1941, R-1 remained in the southern New England area for the first days of American participation in World War II. On 9 and 10 December she patrolled the sealanes leading to New England and on 11 December arrived at Bermuda, whence, with other SubRon 7 boats, she joined the hunt for U-boats preying on maritime traffic along the North American coast. Although limited in cruising range, the R-boats operating out of Ordnance Island, Bermuda continued their patrols through the Kriegsmarine submarine offensive of early 1942.

In February, the submarines established a patrol line between Bermuda and Nantucket Island. R-1 continued patrols out of Bermuda until returning to New London on 20 July for upkeep and coastal patrols. At the end of September, she resumed operations out of Bermuda. Through November 1944 she rotated between Bermuda and New London and, at the latter, in December underwent an extensive conversion to enable her to participate in the development of ASW equipment and tactics. Emerging from the yard on 26 February 1945, she steamed to New York City on 28 February; then headed south to Florida for three weeks of operations off Port Everglades, Florida. In April, she returned to New London, then on to Casco Bay, Maine, for further ASW tests. Returning to the Thames River base on 29 June, she headed south again on 7 July and at mid-month reported for duty with the Fleet Sonar School at Key West, Florida, where she served for the remainder of her career.

R-1 decommissioned at Key West on 20 September 1945 and was struck from the Naval Vessel Register on 10 November. Raised three days later, she was sold for scrap on 13 March 1946 to Macey O. Smith of Miami, Florida.

See also
Bride 13 (1920)

References

External links
 

United States R-class submarines
World War II submarines of the United States
Ships built in Quincy, Massachusetts
1918 ships